Heideveld Secondary School is a school in Cape Town, Western Cape, in a suburb called Heideveld in South Africa. The school is considered to be a widely known school due to its location next to a city main road and train tracks. The school is also one of the first e-Learning school's in the Western Cape. The education system mostly focuses on academics providing both practical and theoretical studies. The secondary school also has clubs one can join from sports, art, musical, tech and other departments from hiking and debating. After school educational programs are present for further assistance in study's.

School 
Heideveld is a diverse suburb with different types of people and culture same can be applied to the students and teachers of Heideveld secondary. With students ranging from the academically achieved and physically gifted with no sign of a stupid learner. All learners are considered to be talented and able to achieve success. The school provides a standard government based curriculum issued by Western Cape government for learners to be assessed on. Subjects will differ from grades since the school provides the extended grades of the GET phase and has the FET phases for the senior learners.

Provided subjects in the institution are:

 Mathematics and mathematics literacy
 Physics
 Life sciences
 Languages: English, Afrikaans and Xhosa
 Engineering graphics and design
 Geography
 History
 Accounting
 Economics
 Consumer studies
 Business studies
 Life orientation

The school also has GET based subjects like EMS, technology for grades 8 and 9s which both serve as less complicated counterparts of their successors Economics and Engineering.

References

Schools in Cape Town
Athlone, Cape Town